Europe of Democracies and Diversities (EDD) was an Eurosceptic political group with seats in the European Parliament between 1999 and 2004. Following the 2004 European elections, the group reformed as Independence/Democracy (IND/DEM).

Members

References

External links
European Parliament Annual Accounts of Political Groups
Europe Politique
European Parliament profile of Jens-Peter Bonde
Entry on Konrad-Adenauer-Stiftung

Former European Parliament party groups
Euroscepticism

sv:Demokratiernas och mångfaldens Europa